Borys Pavlovich Tereshchuk (18 March 1945 – 10 June 2011) was a Ukrainian former volleyball player who competed for the Soviet Union in the 1968 Summer Olympics. He was born in Kyiv. In 1968, he was part of the Soviet team that won the gold medal in the Olympic tournament. He played eight matches.

External links

 
 

1945 births
2011 deaths
Ukrainian men's volleyball players
Soviet men's volleyball players
Olympic volleyball players of the Soviet Union
Volleyball players at the 1968 Summer Olympics
Olympic gold medalists for the Soviet Union
Olympic medalists in volleyball
Sportspeople from Kyiv
Medalists at the 1968 Summer Olympics